General Motors used the P-body or P platform designation to refer to two different vehicle lines:

 1984–1988 mid-engined Pontiac Fiero
 1996–2003 electric General Motors EV1, a.k.a. the BEV1 platform retroactively since the introduction of the BEV2 platform.

References

P platform